Natural Thing may refer to:

Natural Thing (Tanya Blount album), 1994
Natural Thing, an album by Poi Dog Pondering
Natural Thing, an album by Juliet Roberts
"Natural Thing", a song by Innocence
"Natural Thing", a song by UFO on their album No Heavy Petting
The Natural Thing (Jonathan Edwards album), 1989
The Natural Thing (Jack McDuff album), 1968